Depressaria radiosquamella is a moth of the family Depressariidae. It is found on Corsica.

The wingspan is 20–24 mm. The forewings are pale cinereous (ash-grey) with a rosy tinge and smeared with fuscous, especially towards the base of the fold and dorsum. The hindwings are shining pale bone colour.

References

External links
lepiforum.de - Bestimmungshilfe des Lepiforums: Depressaria Radiosquamella (in German)

Moths described in 1898
Depressaria
Moths of Europe